Urban, city, or town planning is the discipline of planning which explores several aspects of the built and social environments of municipalities and communities:

A 
Ancient Chinese urban planning
- American Institute of Certified Planners (AICP)
- American Planning Association
- Athens Charter

B 
Broadacre City

C 
Circles of Sustainability
- Canadian Institute of Planners
- Concentric zone model
- Coving (urban planning)
- Crime prevention through environmental design

D

E 
eGovernment
- Environmental design
- Environmental planning

F 
Floor Area Ratio

G 
Garden city movement
- Geographic information system (GIS)
- Grid plan

H 
Healthy development measurement tool - Health impact of light rail - HUD USER - Hudson's village model

I 
International Society of City and Regional Planners

J 
Journal of Transport and Land Use

K 
Killian Pretty Review

L 
Land use conflict
- Land use planning
- Landscape architecture
- Linear city
- List of planning journals

M 
Manhattanization
- Manual for Streets (in the UK)
- Metropolitan planning organization
- MONU - magazine on urbanism

N 
New Pedestrianism
- New town
- New Urbanism

O 
Online land planning

P 
Pedestrian zone - Planetizen
- Planning Institute Australia
- Prague Institute
- Principles of Intelligent Urbanism
- Public open space

Q

R 
Radical planning
- Regional Planning
- Regulatory Barriers Clearinghouse
- Royal Town Planning Institute

S 
Setback
- SimCity series
- Smart growth
- Spatial planning

T 
Terminating vista
- Town and Country Planning Association
- Town and Country Planning in the United Kingdom
- Transferable development rights
- Transit Oriented Development
- Transportation Planning

U 
Unified settlement planning
- Unitary urbanism
- United States metropolitan area
- Urban area
- Urban design
- Urban forest
- Urban forestry
- Urban Land Institute
- Urban planning education
- Urban planning in Africa
- Urban planning in ancient Egypt
- Urban planning in Australia
- Urban planning in China
- Urban planning in France
- Urban planning in Japan
- Urban planning in communist countries
- Urban planning in the European Union
- Urban planning in Shanghai
- Urban planning in Singapore
- Urban Planning Society of China
- Urban plans in Iran
- Urban reforestation
- Urban renewal
- Urban sprawl
- Urban village
- Urbanomics

V 
Vancouverism

W 
World Cities Summit
- World's most livable cities

X

Y

Z 
Zoning

See also
 List of planned cities
 List of urban planners
 List of urban theorists
 List of urban studies topics
 MONU – magazine on urbanism
 

Urban planning
Urban planning topics